Charles Taft may refer to:

 Charles Phelps Taft (1843–1929), U.S. Congressman from Ohio and brother of President William Howard Taft
 Charles Phelps Taft II (1897–1983), Mayor of Cincinnati, Ohio and son of President William Howard Taft
 Charles Sabin Taft, physician pressed into service during the assassination of Abraham Lincoln